Robert William Smith (1871 – 2 June 1958) was a New Zealand politician of the Liberal Party.

Political career

In , he won the  electorate, which he held to 1922, when he was defeated by Labour's Frank Langstone.

References

1871 births
1958 deaths
New Zealand Liberal Party MPs
New Zealand MPs for North Island electorates
Members of the New Zealand House of Representatives
Unsuccessful candidates in the 1922 New Zealand general election
Unsuccessful candidates in the 1928 New Zealand general election
Date of birth unknown